LGBT-related films released in the 1990s are listed in the following articles:
 List of LGBT-related films of 1990
 List of LGBT-related films of 1991
 List of LGBT-related films of 1992
 List of LGBT-related films of 1993
 List of LGBT-related films of 1994
 List of LGBT-related films of 1995
 List of LGBT-related films of 1996
 List of LGBT-related films of 1997
 List of LGBT-related films of 1998
 List of LGBT-related films of 1999

 
1990s